Lotus 20 was a Formula Junior car built by Lotus for the 1961 season as a successor to the Lotus 18.

The chassis was a spaceframe, clothed in fibreglass bodywork.  It had front double wishbone suspension, but the rear had a lower wishbone with the driveshaft being fixed length and therefore used as a top link. Originally fitted with Alfin drum brakes at all four corners, it was soon upgraded to discs in front and inboard drums at the rear. Equipped as standard with the Cosworth Mk.IV engine and with either a Renault Dauphine gearbox or Hewland-modified VW box.

Compared with the Lotus 18, the 20 had a much reduced frontal area and lower centre of gravity, aided by the fact the driving position was reclined so the driver was nearly lying down, compared with being more upright in the Lotus 18.

A 1962 Lotus 20 can be found hanging from the ceiling on the first floor at the Canadian Automotive Museum, located in Oshawa, Ontario, Canada.

Lotus 20B
The 20B was mostly the same as the 20, but with sway bar and stock inboard drum brakes in the rear. Occasionally, 20Bs ran with Lotus TwinCam, and therefore didn't race as a Formula Junior, but as Formula Libre and in other series such as the Tasman series.

A Lotus 20 was entered in the 1965 South African Grand Prix for Dave Charlton but failed to pre-qualify.

Complete Formula One World Championship results

References 

20
Formula Junior cars
Tasman Series cars